Ryan Arambula (born December 19, 1993) is an American soccer player.

Career
Arambula played fours years of college soccer at the University of South Carolina, where he made 61 appearances for the Gamecocks, scoring 3 goals and tallying 12 assists.

Arambula also played with USL PDL side Myrtle Beach Mutiny, appearing for them in a fixture against Charlotte Eagles in the Lamar Hunt US Open Cup on May 11, 2016.

Rittmeyer signed with United Soccer League club Charleston Battery on March 21, 2017. He made his professional league debut as an injury time substitute in a 1-1 draw with Penn FC on April 21, 2018.

References

1993 births
Living people
American soccer players
Association football midfielders
Charleston Battery players
Myrtle Beach Mutiny players
People from Myrtle Beach, South Carolina
South Carolina Gamecocks men's soccer players
Soccer players from South Carolina
USL Championship players